Haruna Moshi Shabani (born 31 May 1987) is a Tanzanian professional footballer who plays as an attacking midfielder for Young Africans.

Club career
Moshi was born in Tabora, Tanzania. He has played most of his career with local club Simba SC. However, he played one season with Muscat Club in Oman.

On 27 October 2009, it was announced that Moshi would have a trial at Swedish 2008 champions, Kalmar FF, together with fellow Tanzanian Joseph Kaniki. On 19 November 2009, Gefle IF reported that they had signed. Moshi.

On 15 July 2010, Moshi returned home to doubts and questions after failing to impress in the Swedish first division, and rejoined Simba SC with undisclosed deal.

After completing his contract with Simba SC he joined Coastal Union of Tanga, Tanzania.

International career
Moshi has played 24 games for the Tanzania national team, but has not been called up since the 2009 African Nations Championship finals.

References

External links
 
 Tanzanian Simba SC player, Haruna Moshi Not For Sale - SportyAfrica.com
 
 

1987 births
Living people
People from Tabora Region
Association football midfielders
Tanzanian footballers
Tanzania international footballers
Tanzanian expatriate footballers
Allsvenskan players
Moro United F.C. players
Simba S.C. players
Gefle IF players
Coastal Union F.C. players
Mbeya City F.C. players
African Lyon F.C. players
Young Africans S.C. players
Expatriate footballers in Sweden
Tanzanian expatriate sportspeople in Sweden
Expatriate footballers in Oman
Tanzanian expatriate sportspeople in Oman
Tanzanian Premier League players
Tanzania A' international footballers
2009 African Nations Championship players